Joseph Brian Johnston (born November 26, 1962) is a former American football center who played two seasons with the New York Giants of the National Football League (NFL). He was drafted by the New York Giants in the third round of the 1985 NFL Draft. Johnston played college football at the University of North Carolina and attended Glenelg High School in Glenelg, Maryland. He was a member of the New York Giants team that won Super Bowl XXI.

References

External links
 Just Sports Stats

Living people
1962 births
American football centers
New York Giants players
North Carolina Tar Heels football players
People from Howard County, Maryland
Players of American football from Maryland